Tommy R. Smith (born December 15, 1950) is an American politician. He served as a member of the Georgia House of Representatives.

Life and career 
Smith was born in Bacon County, Georgia. He attended Georgia Southern University.

Smith served in the Georgia House of Representatives from 1978 to 2012.

References 

1950 births
Living people
People from Bacon County, Georgia
Democratic Party members of the Georgia House of Representatives
Georgia (U.S. state) Republicans
20th-century American politicians
21st-century American politicians
Georgia Southern University alumni